Otto Pablo Schmitt Schefelis (born January 28, 1965) is a male former field hockey goalkeeper from Argentina. He competed for his native country at the 1988 Summer Olympics, finishing in 8th place. He was succeeded as a first choice goalie by Emanuel Roggero.

References
Profile

External links
 

1965 births
Living people
Argentine male field hockey players
Field hockey players at the 1988 Summer Olympics
Olympic field hockey players of Argentina
Argentine people of German descent
Pan American Games silver medalists for Argentina
Pan American Games medalists in field hockey
Field hockey players at the 1987 Pan American Games
1990 Men's Hockey World Cup players
Medalists at the 1987 Pan American Games
20th-century Argentine people